Gentingia is a monotypic genus of flowering plants in the family Rubiaceae. The genus contains only one species, viz. Gentingia subsessilis, which is endemic to Malaysia.

References

Monotypic Rubiaceae genera
Prismatomerideae